Missionary is a 2013 drama thriller film by Anthony DiBlasi. It received its world premiere on July 25, 2013 at the Fantasia International Film Festival and stars Dawn Olivieri as a single mother caught up in one man's obsession with her.

Plot summary
Katherine (Dawn Olivieri) is a mother trying to raise her son Kesley (Connor Christie) the best she can, despite being recently separated from her husband Ian (Kip Pardue). When Mormon missionary Elder Kevin Brock (Mitch Ryan) offers to help her son practice football, both he and Katherine are drawn to one another. Despite some worries about the 10 year age difference between the two of them, Katherine and Kevin are initially happy in their blossoming relationship. It takes a sour turn when Katherine decides to try to work things out with her estranged husband, which doesn't sit well with Kevin. Already a little mentally unstable, Kevin's warped mind tries to use his religion to justify making Katherine his... forever.

Cast
Dawn Olivieri as Katherine Kingsman
Mitch Ryan as Kevin Brock
Kip Pardue as Ian Kingsman
J. LaRose as Sarge Powell
Connor Christie as Kesley Kingsman
Jordan Woods-Robinson as Alan Whitehall
Randy Molnar as President Andersen
Danielle Kimberley as April Britton
Dushawn Moses as Doctor West
Jesse Malinowski as Elder Lillejord
Jeff Chase as Brian
Mary Lankford Poiley as Crystal (as Mary Lankford)

Reception
Critical reception for Missionary has been mixed to positive, and Dread Central called the movie an "exemplary specimen of human horror done right.".  Part of the film's criticism stemmed from the movie's familiarity to other films in the stalker/slasher genre, but Fearnet noted that "You know most of what Missionary has in store before you hit play, but the final product is still a well-crafted and efficient little thriller." Several reviewers brought up concerns about whether or not the film would be considered offensive to people and Empire Online commented that DiBlasi and crew were "careful not to demonise the entire religion, and [took] time to make its elders likeably normal". Bloody Disgusting gave the film a positive review and wrote that "DiBlasi has crafted a tightly wound downward spiral of infidelity, violence, and small-town adversity that’s a model of restraint."

References

External links

2013 films
2013 thriller drama films
American thriller drama films
2013 drama films
Works about Mormon missionaries
2010s English-language films
2010s American films